Sotiris Kannavos (born 24 February 1975) is a retired Greek football striker.

References

1975 births
Living people
Greek footballers
Ionikos F.C. players
Kallithea F.C. players
Panegialios F.C. players
Super League Greece players
Association football forwards